ASM Mozammel Haque is a Bangladesh Jamaat-e-Islami politician and the former Member of Parliament of Jessore-4 and Jhenaidah-3.

Career
Haque was elected a member of parliament from Undivided Jessore-4 as an Islamic Democratic League candidate in 1979 Bangladeshi general election. He was elected to parliament from Jhenaidah-3 as a Bangladesh Jamaat-e-Islami candidate in 1986. In 1987, he and 10 other MPs resigned from the post of Member of Parliament following the party decision of Bangladesh Jamaat-e-Islami.

He was defeated in the fifth parliamentary elections of 1991 and the seventh parliamentary elections on 12 June 1996 as a candidate of Bangladesh Jamaat-e-Islami from Jhenaidah-3 constituency.

References

Bangladesh Jamaat-e-Islami politicians
3rd Jatiya Sangsad members
Islamic Democratic League politicians
2nd Jatiya Sangsad members
Year of death unknown
Year of birth missing
People from Jhenaidah District